The 2019–20 Parma Calcio 1913 season was the club's second consecutive season back in Serie A, following their promotion from Serie B at the end of the 2017–18 season. The club competed in Serie A and the Coppa Italia.

Players

Squad information

Appearances include league matches only

Transfers

In

Loans in

Out

Loans out

Pre-season and friendlies

Competitions

Serie A

League table

Results summary

Results by round

Matches

Coppa Italia

Statistics

Appearances and goals

|-
! colspan=14 style=background:#DCDCDC; text-align:center"| Goalkeepers

|-
! colspan=14 style=background:#DCDCDC; text-align:center"| Defenders

|-
! colspan=14 style=background:#DCDCDC; text-align:center"| Midfielders

|-
! colspan=14 style=background:#DCDCDC; text-align:center"| Forwards

|-
! colspan=14 style=background:#DCDCDC; text-align:center"| Players transferred out during the season

Goalscorers

Last updated: 28 July 2020

Clean sheets

Last updated: 9 February 2020

Disciplinary record

Last updated: 9 February 2020

References

Parma Calcio 1913 seasons
Parma